The Rio Grande Scenic Railroad of Colorado was a heritage railway that operated from 2006 to 2019 in and around the San Luis Valley as a subsidiary of the San Luis and Rio Grande Railroad. The heritage railroad ceased operating excursions following a wildfire that damaged some of their facilities, as well as the parent company SLRG entering Chapter 11 bankruptcy in late 2019.

History 

The Denver and Rio Grande Railroad was chartered in 1870. The line over La Veta Pass to Alamosa and Antonito was originally envisioned as part of an ambitious and never-realized narrow gauge line linking Denver with Mexico City. The narrow gauge tracks crossed the pass in 1877 and reached Alamosa on July 6, 1878. The railroad was pushed on to Antonito by 1880 and ultimately to Santa Fe and Silverton. The D&RG built west from Alamosa, completing the line to South Fork and its terminus at Creede in 1881. The D&RG converted the La Veta Pass and the Creede lines to standard gauge around 1900. The line to Antonito was also converted to standard gauge, but a third rail, laid to three-foot gauge, remained to Alamosa until the end of regular narrow gauge operation in 1968. Coincident with the conversion to standard gauge, the D&RG realigned the route over La Veta Pass to lower the summit, straighten curves, and reduce grades.

In 1908, the D&RG was consolidated with the Rio Grande Western to form the Denver and Rio Grande Western. In 1988, the DRGW merged with the Southern Pacific Railroad; the Union Pacific Railroad purchased and merged the SP in 1996. In June 2003, the UP sold the Walsenburg – Alamosa line and its other lines in the San Luis Valley to shortline railroad conglomerate RailAmerica. RailAmerica sold the SLRG to Iowa Pacific Holdings in December 2005.

Iowa Pacific established the Rio Grande Scenic Railroad in 2006. Trains operated over the Sangre de Cristo Mountains via Veta Pass and from Alamosa to Antonito, where passengers could connect with the narrow gauge Cumbres and Toltec.

Between 2007 and 2013, the fan trips would often be pulled by a steam locomotive. First, there was Ex-Southern Pacific 2-6-0 “Mogul” type No. 1744, but it was taken out of service quickly due to firebox issues. The only other steam locomotive that operated on the SLRG was Ex-Lake Superior and Ishpeming 2-8-0 “consolidation” type No. 18.

The San Luis and Rio Grande Railroad discontinued the passenger excursions in 2019 following a wildfire that damaged the Fir Concert Grounds, and then later when the railroad entered bankruptcy and began liquidating unnecessary assets. This liquidation involved the sale of locomotives and rolling stock to the Colebrookdale Railroad and the Reading Blue Mountain and Northern Railroad in Pennsylvania.

Locomotives

The Rio Grande Scenic Railroad collection included both vintage steam locomotives and diesel locomotives. Notably, they operated former Lake Superior and Ishpeming Railroad locomotive #18, built by the American Locomotive Company at its Pittsburgh works in 1910.  This locomotive previously operated on the Grand Canyon Railway and the Mount Hood Railroad, and following the Rio Grande Scenic Railroad's dissolution, it is now owned by the Colebrookdale Railroad in Pennsylvania. They also owned former Southern Pacific locomotive #1744, which was sold to the Pacific Locomotive Association and moved to the Niles Canyon Railway.

Rolling Stock
The Rio Grande Scenic operated a collection of historic passenger cars in their excursion service, including:

 Five remodeled dome cars for railroad sightseeing, with a glass roof on top of the car where passengers can ride and see in all directions around the train;
 1920s-era Pullman built modernised Heavyweight archroof “open-window” cars with bench-style seating for passengers and the option of opening windows. These cars were built for the Southern Railway between 1924 and 1926 and came to the Rio Grande Scenic from Mount Hood;
 1920s-era Pullman built Heavyweight Open Air Observation No 1056 “Lookout Mountain”. This open air observation car was built for the Southern Railway as coach 1595 and later rebuilt into an open air observation (eventually 2 other open air coaches (without rear platforms) followed No 1069 “Missionary Ridge” and 1070 “W. Graham Claytor”) and was heavily used  on the Southern Railway Steam Specials between 1966 and 1987, finally coming to the Rio Grande Scenic from Mount Hood.;
 1950s-era restored Pullman Coaches with large sealed windows, heating, air conditioning, and concessions;
 Lounge Car ‘Mardi Gras’ restored first-class lounge car with floor-to-ceiling observation windows in a rounded end observation lounge. This car was rebuilt from a coach by the Illinois Central for use on the ‘City of New Orleans’. Legend has it this was the car that the song of the same name was written in. After a stint in service behind N&W 611 the car returned to Illinois Central livery around 2010.;
 Lounge Car ‘Calumet Club’ restored first-class lounge car with flat (or “blind end”) observation windows in a flat end observation lounge. 
 Dining Car 448 Former New York Central stainless steel fluted side lightweight dining car, restored and used in food service.

Special events
The Rio Grande Scenic operated a variety of special events, including Mother's Day Brunch in the dome cars, Rails & Ales Brewfest, Jazz on the Tracks mountain concerts, Oktoberfest, fall foliage and pumpkin patch rides; and the Train to Christmas Town.

See also

List of Colorado historic railroads
List of heritage railroads in Colorado

References

External links 

Rio Grande Scenic Railroad Home Page

Tourist attractions in Alamosa County, Colorado
Heritage railroads in Colorado
Tourist attractions in Huerfano County, Colorado
Tourist attractions in Rio Grande County, Colorado
San Luis Valley of Colorado
Transportation in Alamosa County, Colorado
Transportation in Huerfano County, Colorado
Transportation in Rio Grande County, Colorado